Brent Cash is a singer–songwriter from Athens, Georgia.

Music career
Cash's musical career started as a drummer for several bands (including the Planets, the Michael Guthrie Band and Television Buzz), all the while recording his own pop music in his home on a four-track. He released two separate four-track recordings in the 1990s, "Muse Rapture" and "The Most Beautiful Girls In The World Have Unpronounceable Last Names," distributing cassette tapes to friends and acquaintances. In 2008, Cash decided to step up the production levels on his first full-length album, 2008's How Will I Know If I'm Awake.

Cash's second album How Strange It Seems was released in Europe on May 27, 2011, and was released worldwide on June 7, 2011.

Cash released his third album, The New High in January 2017, featuring Cash playing every instrument on the album except for the strings.

Discography

How Will I Know If I'm Awake (2008)

How Will I Know If I'm Awake is Brent Cash's debut album, recorded with Andy Baker (Jucifer, Japancakes, The Mercury Program). The songs consists of beachy atmospheres of "I Think I’m Falling In Love" to the ballad "Love Is Burning Down Tonight", a duet with Amanda Kapouzos of Tin Cup Prophette that also features a small string orchestra. The album was released in 2008 on the Marina Records label, and garnered largely positive reviews as a throwback to 60s-era sunshine pop.

Track listing

How Strange It Seems (2011)

How Strange It Seems is Brent Cash's second album, recorded with Joel Hatstat (of Joel Hatstat Audio). Like Cash's debut album, the songs consist of a wide variety of musical styles. The album was released in Europe on May 27, 2011 on the Marina Records label.The album was released in the U.S. on June 7, 2011.

Track listing

"The New High" (2017)

The New High is Brent Cash's third album. Like the previous release, this album was recorded in Athens, Ga, with Joel Hatstat (of Joel Hatstat Audio).  The album showcases Cash on vocals & all instruments except for the strings. The album was released on January 27, 2017.

Track listing

Other songs

Unreleased albums
 Muse Rapture
The Most Beautiful Girls In The World Have Unpronounceable Last Names

Games
2008: "Dear My Friend" – Ending theme of Sonic Unleashed released on Planetary Pieces: Sonic World Adventure Original Soundtrack, it is one of his first songs.

References

External links
 Brent Cash page
 Brent Cash on Facebook

Surf musicians
Video game musicians
Sonic the Hedgehog
Living people
Year of birth missing (living people)